Charo is the stage name of María Rosario Pilar Martínez Molina Baeza, a Spanish-American entertainment personality.

Charo is a feminine given name, feminine nickname or surname. It is a diminutive of Hail Mary (a shortened form of María (del) Rosario). It means 'rosary' in Spanish and is thus a pet name for Rosario. It is also sometimes a diminutive of Charlotte. It may also refer to the following:

Given name
Charo Sádaba Chalezquer (born 1972), Spanish advertising professor
Charo Ronquillo (born 1990), Filipino fashion model

Nickname
Charo Santos-Concio, nickname of María Rosario Santos y Navarro de Concio (born 1955), Filipina media executive and actress
Charo López, stage name of María del Rosario López Piñuelas (born 1943), Spanish actress
Charo Soriano, nickname of Maria Rosario Soriano (born 1985), Filipino volleyball player and coach

Surname
Robin Alta Charo (born 1958), American bioethics professor

See also

Caro (given name)
Caro (surname)
Char (name)
Chara (given name)
Chara (surname)
Chard (name)
Chari (surname)
Charl (name)
Charo (disambiguation)
Charon
Charos Kayumova
Claro (surname)